Sigourney Public Library is located in Sigourney, Iowa, United States.  After the Keokuk County Courthouse was completed in 1911 the local community formed a library committee to build a new public library.  They purchased the property in 1912 and received $10,000 from the Carnegie Corporation of New York to fund the new building.  The Chicago architectural firm of Patton, Holmes & Flinn designed the new library in a combination of the Bungalow and Colonial Revival styles.  The single story brick structure is built on a raised foundation.  It features an entrance that is slightly projected, a symmetrical facade, and it is capped with a hipped roof.  It was dedicated in May 1914, and was one of 101 public libraries that were built in Iowa with assistance from the Carnegie Corporation.  The building was listed on the National Register of Historic Places in 1983.  The Sigourney Public Library moved to its present location in the renovated Blackie's Grocery Store building located on Iowa Highway 92 in 2005.

References

Library buildings completed in 1914
Public libraries in Iowa
National Register of Historic Places in Keokuk County, Iowa
Bungalow architecture in Iowa
Colonial Revival architecture in Iowa
Libraries on the National Register of Historic Places in Iowa
Sigourney, Iowa
Carnegie libraries in Iowa